"The Horror at Martin's Beach" is a short story by American writers H. P. Lovecraft and Sonia H. Greene. It was written in June 1922 and first published (as "The Invisible Monster") in November 1923 in Weird Tales (Vol. 2, No. 4, 75–76, 83).

Plot 
Sailors kill a 50-foot creature at sea after a lengthy battle. The creature bears strange anatomical irregularities such as a single large eye and rudimentary forelegs and six-toed feet in place of pectoral fins. After inspection by marine biologists, it is revealed to be just a juvenile. The captain who captured the creature tours the coast and profits from the corpse of the deceased creature. As the captain attempts to finish his business at Martin's Beach, a group of swimmers are attacked. The captain and others attempt to rescue the victims but it is too late. The rescuers and the captain are hypnotized and pulled into the water by the creature's apparently vengeful mother, to the horror of an onlooking crowd.

References in other media 
The story has been included in at least four collections of Lovecraft's works:
 Something About Cats and Other Pieces, Arkham House, 1949. Facsimile reprint by Books for Libraries Press, 1971.
 The Horror in the Museum and Other Revisions. Sauk City, WI: Arkham House, 1970. As "The Invisible Monster" by Sonia Greene 
 The Horror in the Museum and Other Revisions. Edited by S. T. Joshi. Sauk City, WI: Arkham House, 1989, 325-30. As "The Horror at Martin’s Beach" by Sonia H. Greene
 The Loved Dead and Other Revisions. New York: Carroll & Graf Publishers, 1997, 125-30.

References

External links
 

1923 short stories
Collaborative short stories
Fantasy short stories
Pulp stories
Short stories by H. P. Lovecraft
Works originally published in Weird Tales